LRU may refer to:

Organisations
 Latvian Russian Union, an ethnic minority, left-wing political party in Latvia
 Lenoir–Rhyne University, US
 Lithuanian Riflemen's Union, a paramilitary organisation in Lithuania
 London Reform Union, a former campaigning group of the Progressive Party

Other uses
 Las Cruces International Airport (IATA code), US
 Least recently used, a cache replacement algorithm
 A page replacement algorithm in virtual memory management
 Liberties and Responsibilities of Universities, a French law voted in 2007
 Line-replaceable unit, a modular component of an airplane or other manufactured device